Hieracium hypochoeroides, the cat's-ear hawkweed, is a species of flowering plant in the family Asteraceae, native to Europe. Hieracium hypochoeroides is a recently arisen species aggregate.

Images

Subtaxa
The following subspecies are accepted:

Hieracium hypochoeroides subsp. acutiserratum (Zahn) Greuter – France
Hieracium hypochoeroides subsp. adesiforme (Zahn) Greuter – France, Italy, Switzerland
Hieracium hypochoeroides subsp. adesum (Bernoulli & Zahn) Greuter – France, Italy, Switzerland
Hieracium hypochoeroides subsp. apertorum (Zahn) Greuter – Germany
Hieracium hypochoeroides subsp. arnoldianum (Zahn) W.Lippert & Schuhw. – Germany
Hieracium hypochoeroides subsp. ayliesii (Zahn) Greuter – Corsica
Hieracium hypochoeroides subsp. bifidopsis (Zahn) Gottschl. – Italy
Hieracium hypochoeroides subsp. bridelianum (Zahn) Greuter – France, Italy, Switzerland
Hieracium hypochoeroides subsp. canibifidum (Arv.-Touv.) Greuter – France
Hieracium hypochoeroides subsp. cilentanum Di Grist., Gottschl. & Raimondo – Italy
Hieracium hypochoeroides subsp. cinerascentiforme (Zahn) Greuter – France, Italy
Hieracium hypochoeroides subsp. crinicaesium (Schack & Zahn) Greuter – Germany
Hieracium hypochoeroides subsp. crinifrons (Zahn) Greuter – France
Hieracium hypochoeroides subsp. cryptochaetophyllum (T.Georgiev & Zahn) Greuter – Bulgaria
Hieracium hypochoeroides subsp. cyanellum (Zahn) Greuter – France
Hieracium hypochoeroides subsp. dalmaticum (Kümmerle & Zahn) Greuter – Slovenia, Croatia
Hieracium hypochoeroides subsp. divergentidens (Schack & Zahn) Greuter – Liechtenstein
Hieracium hypochoeroides subsp. dolichellum (Arv.-Touv. & Gaut.) Greuter – Austria, France, Italy, Switzerland
Hieracium hypochoeroides subsp. epimecodon (Romieux & Zahn) Greuter – France
Hieracium hypochoeroides subsp. epimecodontoides (Romieux & Zahn) Greuter – France
Hieracium hypochoeroides subsp. epirense (Zahn) Greuter – Greece, Switzerland
Hieracium hypochoeroides subsp. erucibifidum (Arv.-Touv.) Greuter – France
Hieracium hypochoeroides subsp. fissifurcum (Arv.-Touv. & Gaut.) Greuter – Corsica, France
Hieracium hypochoeroides subsp. fojnicense (Zahn) Greuter – Yugoslavia
Hieracium hypochoeroides subsp. gladiatiforme (Schack & Zahn) Greuter – Germany
Hieracium hypochoeroides subsp. glaucibifidum (Arv.-Touv. & Gaut.) Greuter – France, Italy
Hieracium hypochoeroides subsp. glaucocinerascens (Harz & Zahn ex Schack) Schuhw. – Germany
Hieracium hypochoeroides subsp. grandisaxense Gottschl. – Italy
Hieracium hypochoeroides subsp. grossidentatum (Joch.Müll.) Greuter – Germany
Hieracium hypochoeroides subsp. guaranum (Arv.-Touv. & Gaut.) Greuter – Spain
Hieracium hypochoeroides subsp. guestphalicum (Gottschl.) Greuter – Germany
Hieracium hypochoeroides subsp. hemibifidum (Zahn) Greuter – France, Italy
Hieracium hypochoeroides subsp. herculanum (Zahn) Greuter – Romania
Hieracium hypochoeroides subsp. hypochoeroides – Austria, Corsica, Czechoslovakia, France, Faroe Islands, Germany, Great Britain, Hungary, Ireland, Italy, Norway, Romania, Sardinia, Switzerland, Yugoslavia
Hieracium hypochoeroides subsp. hypotephraeum (Zahn) Greuter – France
Hieracium hypochoeroides subsp. jacquiniiforme (Litard. & Zahn) Greuter – Corsica
Hieracium hypochoeroides subsp. jenzigense (Bornm. & Zahn) Greuter – Germany
Hieracium hypochoeroides subsp. kalmutinum (Zahn) Schuhw. & Feulner – Germany
Hieracium hypochoeroides subsp. kunitzburgense (Bornm. & Zahn) Greuter – Germany
Hieracium hypochoeroides subsp. kyllenense (Zahn) Greuter – Greece
Hieracium hypochoeroides subsp. lineatiforme (Zahn) Greuter – France, Italy
Hieracium hypochoeroides subsp. lineatoides (Zahn) Greuter – France, Italy
Hieracium hypochoeroides subsp. lithophilum (Arv.-Touv.) Greuter – Corsica, France, Italy
Hieracium hypochoeroides subsp. livadicae (O.Behr) Greuter – Yugoslavia
Hieracium hypochoeroides subsp. lucanicum (Arv.-Touv.) Di Grist., Gottschl. & Raimondo – Italy
Hieracium hypochoeroides subsp. medelingense (Wiesb. ex Dichtl) Gottschl. – Austria
Hieracium hypochoeroides subsp. mollardianum (Briq. & Zahn) Greuter – France
Hieracium hypochoeroides subsp. monomeres (Zahn) Greuter – Austria, France
Hieracium hypochoeroides subsp. montis-scuderii Di Grist., Gottschl., Galesi, Raimondo & Cristaudo – Sicily
Hieracium hypochoeroides subsp. nervulosum (Arv.-Touv. & Gaut.) Greuter – Corsica, France, Italy
Hieracium hypochoeroides subsp. niphanthodes (Bornm. & Zahn) Greuter – Germany
Hieracium hypochoeroides subsp. pallidopsis Gottschl. – Italy
Hieracium hypochoeroides subsp. parvimaculatum (Joch.Müll.) Greuter – Germany
Hieracium hypochoeroides subsp. peracutisquamum Di Grist., Gottschl. & Raimondo – Italy
Hieracium hypochoeroides subsp. pinnatiscissum (Zahn) Greuter – Italy
Hieracium hypochoeroides subsp. plauense (Schack & Zahn) Greuter – Germany
Hieracium hypochoeroides subsp. poeciloprasum (Briq. & Zahn) Greuter – France
Hieracium hypochoeroides subsp. potamogetifolium Gottschl. – Italy
Hieracium hypochoeroides subsp. prasinophyton (Zahn) Gottschl. – France, Italy, Switzerland
Hieracium hypochoeroides subsp. pseudograniticum (Besse & Zahn) Greuter – France, Italy
Hieracium hypochoeroides subsp. pseudomonomeres (Zahn) Greuter – France
Hieracium hypochoeroides subsp. pseudowiesbaurianiforme (Müll.Dornst. & Zahn) Greuter – Germany, Liechtenstein
Hieracium hypochoeroides subsp. retroversidens (Zahn) Greuter – Greece
Hieracium hypochoeroides subsp. rivulicola N.Mey., Gottschl. & Reisch – Germany
Hieracium hypochoeroides subsp. romieuxianum (Zahn) Greuter – France, Switzerland
Hieracium hypochoeroides subsp. rudolphopolitanum (Joch.Müll.) Greuter – Germany
Hieracium hypochoeroides subsp. semicinerascens (Bornm. & Zahn) Greuter – Germany, Liechtenstein, Hungary
Hieracium hypochoeroides subsp. semiwiesbaurianum (Gottschl.) Greuter – Austria
Hieracium hypochoeroides subsp. serinense (Zahn) Greuter – Italy
Hieracium hypochoeroides subsp. stoechadum (Sudre) Greuter – France
Hieracium hypochoeroides subsp. strizakense (O.Behr) Greuter – North Macedonia
Hieracium hypochoeroides subsp. subcaesiellum (Zahn) Greuter – France
Hieracium hypochoeroides subsp. subcanens (Arv.-Touv. & Gaut.) Greuter – France, Italy
Hieracium hypochoeroides subsp. subcinereum (Arv.-Touv. & Gaut.) Greuter – Albania, France, Italy, Yugoslavia
Hieracium hypochoeroides subsp. sublanigerum (Arv.-Touv. ex Belli) Gottschl. & Wagens. – Italy
Hieracium hypochoeroides subsp. sublineolatum (Zahn) Greuter – France, Italy
Hieracium hypochoeroides subsp. supramontanum (Arrigoni) Greuter – Sardinia
Hieracium hypochoeroides subsp. terrei (de Retz) Greuter – Corsica
Hieracium hypochoeroides subsp. uazzanum (Zahn) Greuter – Corsica
Hieracium hypochoeroides subsp. venatovicianum N.Mey., Gottschl. & Reisch – Germany
Hieracium hypochoeroides subsp. ventosicum (Arv.-Touv. & Gaut.) Greuter – France
Hieracium hypochoeroides subsp. wiesbaurianiforme Greuter – Germany
Hieracium hypochoeroides subsp. wiesbaurianum (R.Uechtr.) Greuter – Austria, Belgium, Bulgaria, Corsica, Czechoslovakia, France, Germany, Hungary, Italy, Poland, Romania, Sardinia, Yugoslavia

References

hypochoeroides
Flora of Central Europe
Flora of Corsica
Flora of France
Flora of Great Britain
Flora of Ireland
Flora of Italy
Flora of Norway
Flora of Romania
Flora of Sardinia
Flora of the Faroe Islands
Flora of Yugoslavia
Plants described in 1843